Terry Fitzgerald may refer to:

Terry Fitzgerald (Spawn), a fictional character in the Spawn comics
Terry Fitzgerald (producer) (born 1968), producer of the Spawn comics series
Terry Fitzgerald (footballer) (born 1952), Australian rules footballer for Hawthorn
Terry Fitzgerald (surfer), featured in Morning of the Earth surfing movie

See also 

 Maureen Fitzgerald Terry, Maine politician